Fox Valley Mall, formerly Westfield Fox Valley, is a shopping mall in Aurora, Illinois. The mall's anchor stores are JCPenney, Macy's. Some larger non anchor stores include H&M and Forever 21. A Round One Entertainment is located in the former Sears wing. The Westfield Group acquired the shopping center in early 2002, and renamed it "Westfield Shoppingtown Fox Valley", dropping the "Shoppingtown" name in June 2005. Westfield Group sold 80% interest in mall as of December 2015.

History 

Original planning was started in 1968 by Urban Investment and Development Company; a prototype called Environ 2000.  The first plans had  for development as a planned community to help minimize suburban sprawl.

Fox Valley Center and Villages developers were Metropolitan Structures, Inc., and Westbrook Venture.

The Fox Valley Mall is a  enclosed mall, opened and completed in 1975. Sears and Marshall Field's opened first, followed by JCPenney, Lord & Taylor and 150 other shops and services. Lord & Taylor closed in 1996 and was sold to Carson Pirie Scott (later known as Carson's). Marshall Field's was renamed Macy's in 2006.

This was later followed by marketing for home builders and office development in the area marketed as Fox Valley Villages.

Sales at the mall were stated at $115 million in 1977.

In 1989, a shopping center outside the mall called New York Square was built. It features Kohl's, a former OfficeMax, and other stores. A year later in 1990, another new shopping center, Fox Valley Commons, was built across from the mall. Tenants include International Food Market, and Petland. Former tenants include a Bed Bath And Beyond, Sam's Club, Wal-Mart and Office Depot. An indoor shopping center called Mall of India is slated to open in the former Walmart near the end of 2020. It will feature a grocery store, 10 restaurants, and 30+ retail and office spaces.

Before the mid-2000s, the mall had large gardens and plants spread throughout. They were all removed from the mall shortly after Westfield's purchase.

After Westfield's purchase of the mall, all the signs and usage of the Fox Valley Center logo was discontinued and replaced with Westfield's standard mall brand logo, with the shortened Fox Valley name.  In the same time period there was an extensive renovation of the mall for the first time in its history. After Centennial Real Estate's purchase of 80% interest in the mall in 2015, all "Westfield" signs were replaced with "Fox Valley Mall" signs.

In 2009, A Tilted Kilt Bar & Grill opened between the Carson's and Macy's wings. In 2012, a Tony Sacco's Pizza restaurant  also opened across the Tilted Kilt in the Same hall along with Books-A-Million by Macy's. Round 1 opened in 2017.

On April 18, 2018, it was announced that Carson's would be closing as parent company The Bon-Ton was going out of business. The store closed on August 29, 2018.

On May 31, 2018, Sears announced that it would also be closing its Fox Valley Mall location as part of a plan to close 78 stores nationwide. The store closed on September 2, 2018. This leaves JCPenney and Macy's as the only remaining anchors.

For the Halloween season, Halloween City served as a temporary anchor for the mall in the old Sears in 2019.

On Thanksgiving 2019, Fox Valley Mall opened a new "Center Park" that transformed the mall's formerly unused central courtyard into a public gathering area with green space, places to sit, artwork, and other amenities by the old Carson's. Before Center Park, there was an indoor ice skating rink that moved into an abandoned store, and the ice skating rink will reopen there in November 2020.

In early 2020, Fox Valley Mall began construction on an addition to Center Park, a two-level 8,000 square foot "treehouse" that will connect Center Park to the mall and serve as an additional gathering space.

In late fall 2020, the abandoned Sears began demolition and continued the Fox Valley Mall 2.0 Redevelopment Plan, which will add luxury apartments & other amenities.

Area
The mall is situated on Illinois Route 59 between U.S. 34 and East New York Street / West Aurora Avenue, with 8,006 car parking spaces. The area around the mall has been developed on the east and west sides of the road, with Westridge Court featuring over 30 stores on the Naperville side of Route 59. Other stores in the area include Meijer, Target, Guitar Center, Petsmart, At Home, Marshalls, Ross Stores, Dollar Tree, Jo-Ann Fabrics, Burlington Coat Factory, and other retailers and restaurants.

Gallery

Bus routes 

Pace
 530 West Galena/Naperville
 559 Illinois Route 59

References

External links
 

Buildings and structures in Aurora, Illinois
Shopping malls established in 1975
Shopping malls in DuPage County, Illinois
Tourist attractions in Aurora, Illinois
Fox Valley
1975 establishments in Illinois